Gifi may refer to:

 Gifi Fields (born 1951), British fashion designer and businessman
 GiFi, French chain of discount stores